The 2020–21 St. Bonaventure Bonnies men's basketball team represented St. Bonaventure University during the 2020–21 NCAA Division I men's basketball season. The Bonnies, led by 14th-year head coach Mark Schmidt, played their home games at the Reilly Center in Olean, New York as members of the Atlantic 10 Conference. In a season limited due to the ongoing COVID-19 pandemic, the Bonnies finished the season 16–5, 11–4 in A-10 play to win the regular season A-10 championship. They defeated Duquesne, Saint Louis, and VCU to win the A-10 tournament. As a result, they received the conference's automatic bid to the NCAA tournament as the No. 9 seed in the East region. There they lost to LSU in the first round.

Previous season
The Bonnies finished the 2019–20 season 19–12, 11–7 in A-10 play to finish in a tie for fifth place. Their season ended when the A-10 tournament and all other postseason tournaments were canceled due to the ongoing COVID-19 pandemic.

Offseason

Departures

Incoming transfers

2020 recruiting class

Roster

Schedule and results

|-
!colspan=12 style=| Non-conference regular season
|-

|-
!colspan=12 style=| A-10 regular season
|-

|-
!colspan=12 style=| A-10 tournament

|-
!colspan=12 style=| NCAA tournament

|-

Source

References

St. Bonaventure Bonnies men's basketball seasons
St. Bonaventure
2020 in sports in New York (state)
2021 in sports in New York (state)
St. Bonaventure